Ihor Matviyenko (born May 17, 1971 in Dnipropetrovsk, Ukrainian SSR) is a Ukrainian sailor and Olympic champion. He won a gold medal in the 470 Class at the 1996 Summer Olympics in Atlanta, together with Yevhen Braslavets. He also competed at the 2000 Summer Olympics and the 2004 Summer Olympics.

References

1971 births
Living people
Ukrainian male sailors (sport)
Olympic sailors of Ukraine
Sailors at the 1996 Summer Olympics – 470
Sailors at the 2000 Summer Olympics – 470
Sailors at the 2004 Summer Olympics – 470
Olympic gold medalists for Ukraine
Olympic medalists in sailing
Sportspeople from Dnipro
Medalists at the 1996 Summer Olympics
470 class world champions
World champions in sailing for Ukraine
20th-century Ukrainian people
21st-century Ukrainian people